Li Huchun (born 25 November 1956) is a Chinese speed skater. He competed in two events at the 1980 Winter Olympics.

References

External links
 

1956 births
Living people
Chinese male speed skaters
Olympic speed skaters of China
Speed skaters at the 1980 Winter Olympics
Place of birth missing (living people)
20th-century Chinese people